Oregon is a ghost town in Wilson County, in the U.S. state of Tennessee.

History
The community was named after the territory of Oregon.

References

Geography of Wilson County, Tennessee